In Norse mythology, Útgarðar (literally:  "Outyards", the plural of Útgarðr. The word can, according to Old Norse orthography be anglicized as Utgard, Utgardar and in other ways.) surrounded a stronghold of the jötnar.  They are associated with Útgarða-Loki, a great and devious giant featured in one of the myths concerning Thor and the other Loki who competed in rigged competitions held in the Outyards.  These outdoor arenas contrasted with the putrid, indoor cave where Útgarða-Loki is said to have dwelt, when chained, in the Gesta Danorum (12th century). 

In another version of Norse mythology, Utgard is thought to be the last of the three worlds connected to  Yggdrasil being the home of the external cosmic forces. Utgard needs to be compared with the Midgard, the world of human affairs, and Asgard, variously attested at the crux of the matter, the centre of the world, as identified with Troy by Snorri Sturluson.

References

 
 

Fictional elements introduced in the 12th century
Locations in Norse mythology
Fictional fortifications